Taylor Community School Corporation is a public school district in Howard County, Indiana, United States. The school district serves extreme southern Kokomo, Indiana, Indian Heights, Indiana, and the entity of Taylor Township. The mascot is the Titan.

Administration 
Christopher Smith, Ed.S., Superintendent

Building Directory 
Taylor Elementary School (PreK-5)
Taylor Middle School (6-8)
Taylor High School (9-12)

External links 
Taylor Community School Corporation

School districts in Indiana
Education in Howard County, Indiana